Victor Marie Célestin François Archenoul (born 16 December 1871, date of death unknown) was a French equestrian. He was awarded the silver medal competing in the hacks and hunter at the 1900 Summer Olympics. In 1923, while director of the dressage school in Caen, he was appointed an officer of the Order of Agricultural Merit.

References

External links

1871 births
Sportspeople from Ille-et-Vilaine
Year of death missing
Place of death missing
French male equestrians
Olympic equestrians of France
Equestrians at the 1900 Summer Olympics
Officers of the Order of Agricultural Merit